New Brunswick Southwest (formerly known as Charlotte and St. Croix—Belleisle) is a federal electoral district in New Brunswick, Canada, that has been represented in the House of Commons of Canada since 2004. Its population in 2016 was 65,287.

Political geography
As the name implies, the district comprises the southwestern portion of New Brunswick. It includes all of Charlotte County and portions of York, Sunbury, Queens, Kings and Saint John Counties.

Major towns include St. Stephen, St. Andrews, St. George, Grand Bay–Westfield, McAdam, Harvey Station, Fredericton Junction, Gagetown, and the Kingsclear and Hanwell regions near Fredericton.

The neighbouring ridings are Tobique—Mactaquac, Fredericton, Fundy Royal, and Saint John.

"Charlotte" riding was created in 1867. In 1966, it was merged into Carleton—Charlotte.

"Charlotte" riding was re-created in 1996 primarily from Carleton—Charlotte, and incorporating parts of Fundy—Royal, Saint John, and Fredericton—York—Sunbury ridings. Shortly after the 1997 election, the riding became known as "New Brunswick Southwest".

The 2003 redistribution abolished New Brunswick Southwest. The territory of the riding was combined with the area around Belleisle Bay in south-central New Brunswick), and named "St. Croix—Belleisle". This riding was renamed "New Brunswick Southwest" in 2004.

The 2012 federal electoral redistribution saw this riding gain territory from Fredericton, and lose small portions to Fredericton and Fundy Royal.

Demographics
According to the Canada 2011 Census; 2013 representation

Ethnic groups: 97.1% White, 1.9% Aboriginal 
Languages: 94.4% English, 4.1% French
Religions: 79.8% Christian (22.7% Catholic, 16.2% Baptist, 13.3% Anglican, 10.0% United Church, 5.8% Pentecostal, 2.2% Presbyterian, 9.6% Other), 19.8% No religion 
Median income (2010): $27,133 
Average income (2010): $34,743

Members of Parliament

This riding has elected the following Members of Parliament:

Election results

New Brunswick Southwest, 2004-present Representation Order

St. Croix—Belleisle, 2003-2004 Representation Order

New Brunswick Southwest, 1998-2003 Representation Order

Charlotte, 1996-1998 Representation Order

Charlotte, 1867-1966 historical elections

See also
 List of Canadian federal electoral districts
 Past Canadian electoral districts

References

Notes

External links
Riding history from the Library of Parliament:
Charlotte 1867-1966
Charlotte 1996-1998
NBSW 1998-2003
St. Croix-Belleisle 2003-2004
NBSW 2004-present

New Brunswick federal electoral districts
St. Stephen, New Brunswick